Wei Tuan'er (韋團兒) or Tuaner (died 693), was a Chinese courtier. 

She was a favorite lady-in-waiting of Wu Zetian, and instrumental in a plot which caused the downfall of Crown Princess Liu and Consort Dou, the wife and consort of former Emperor Ruizong of Tang.

References 

7th-century births
693 deaths
Year of birth unknown
Chinese courtiers
Chinese ladies-in-waiting
7th-century Chinese women
7th-century Chinese people
Royal favourites